iBhayi is a large township near Port Elizabeth, South Africa. It is the largest township in the Eastern Cape province and the ninth largest in South Africa after Mitchells Plain near Cape Town in the Western Cape.

In January 2023 a residential home in the iBhayi township of KwaZakhele was the scene of the 2023 Gqeberha mass shooting.

Etymology
iBhayi (sometimes eBhayi) is a Xhosa word meaning "the bay". Although iBhayi is the name used for the collection of predominantly black townships north of Port Elizabeth, it is also used as a name for the city amongst Xhosa-speaking people.

Geography
iBhayi is a collection of predominantly black townships situated north of the city of Port Elizabeth, similar to how Soweto, south-west of Johannesburg is also a collection of predominantly black townships.

Most of iBhayi lies east of the R75 except for its northern extensions of KwaDwesi, New KwaDwesi and Masibulele which lies west of the R75.

iBhayi is surrounded by the predominantly Coloured township of Bethelsdorp and the neighbourhood of Algoa Park in the west, Redhouse and Perseverance in the north-east, Swartkops in the east and Deal Party in the south-east.

The main roads in iBhayi are the R75 to Uitenhage and Despatch in the north and Port Elizabeth in the south and the R367/M19 to Despatch in the north and Swartkops in the south.

Subdivisions
 Joe Slovo
 KwaDwesi / New KwaDwesi
 KwaMagxaki 
 KwaZakhele
 Masibulele
 New Brighton
 Soweto on Sea
 Struandale Industrial 
 Zwide
 Nkandla
 Motherwell
The Ubuntu Education Fund is based in Zwide, and operates a community center which opened in 2010.

Industries
The Struandale industrial area is a popular industrial node in Nelson Mandela Bay located east of New Brighton and is often considered part of New Brighton.

Notable companies in Struandale include Distell Distribution, DSV Pharmacare, BASF, MW Wheels, Eveready but most importantly the Isuzu automotive manufacturing plant and Ford engine manufacturing plant.

Continental Tyre and PPC Cement have their manufacturing plants in New Brighton.

Demographics (2011)
 Area: 
 Population: 237,799: 
 Households: 63,474: 

Source:

References

Townships in the Eastern Cape
Populated places in Nelson Mandela Bay